Eating Too Fast is a 1966 Andy Warhol film made at The Factory. It was originally titled Blow Job #2 and features art critic and writer Gregory Battcock (1937–1980). The film is 67 minutes long and is, in effect, a black and white sound film remake of Warhol's Blow Job (1964). Battcock had previously appeared in Warhol's films Batman Dracula (1964) and Horse (1965).

Production background
The British Film Institute catalogue says that the first half of the film is a still shot, showing Battcock eating an apple and taking a phone call, while apparently receiving fellatio. The second half of the film has more camera movement. Battcock's diaries say the film was made in Battcock's Greenwich Village apartment with Warhol and Lou Reed present for the filming.

See also

 Andy Warhol filmography
 Art film
 Blue Movie (1969) – Warhol film
 Eat (1964) – Warhol film
 Erotic photography
 Golden Age of Porn (1969–1984)
 Kiss (1963) – Warhol film
 List of American films of 1966
 Sleep (1964) – Warhol film

References

External links
Eating Too Fast at WarholStars
Gregory Battcock on the film
Gregory Battcock at IMDb

1966 short films
1966 films
American LGBT-related films
Fellatio
Films directed by Andy Warhol
American independent films
Oral eroticism
1966 LGBT-related films
1960s English-language films
1960s American films